Kakau is a village and a former municipality in the district of Wittenberg, Saxony-Anhalt, Germany. Since 1 January 2011, it is part of the town Oranienbaum-Wörlitz.

References

Former municipalities in Saxony-Anhalt
Oranienbaum-Wörlitz
Duchy of Anhalt